Anne Knowles may refer to:

 Anne Kelly Knowles (born 1957), American geographer
 Anne Knollys, pronounced and sometimes spelt Knowles, lady-in-waiting to Elizabeth I of England